Manavand or Menavand may refer to:
 Manavand, Darmian
 Manavand, Zirkuh

See also
 Minavand